Concluding Unscientific Postscript to the Philosophical Fragments is a major work by Søren Kierkegaard. The work is an attack against Hegelianism, the philosophy of Hegel, and especially Hegel's Science of Logic. The work is also famous for its dictum, Subjectivity is Truth. It was an attack on what Kierkegaard saw as Hegel's deterministic philosophy. Against Hegel's system, Kierkegaard is often interpreted as taking the side of metaphysical libertarianism or free will, though it has been argued that an incompatibilist conception of free will is not essential to Kierkegaard's formulation of existentialism.

As the title suggests, the Postscript is sequel to the earlier Philosophical Fragments. The title of the work is ironic because the Postscript is almost five times larger than the Fragments. The Postscript credits "Johannes Climacus" as the author and Kierkegaard as its editor. Like his other pseudonymous works, the Postscript is not a reflection of Kierkegaard's own beliefs. However, unlike his other pseudonymous works, Kierkegaard attaches his name as editor to this work, showing the importance of the Postscript to Kierkegaard's overall authorship.

Contrasts in Concluding Unscientific Postscript

Reception
Eduard Geismar was an early lecturer on the works of Soren Kierkegaard. He gave lectures at Princeton Theological Seminary in March 1936 and states this about Johannes Climacus: 

Walter Lowrie characterized Kierkegaard's authorship up to Concluding Postscript as first "Away from the Aesthetical" and then the works ascribed to Johannes Climacus as "Away from Speculation".

Emil Brunner mentioned Kierkegaard 51 times in his 1937 book Man in Revolt and wrote a semi-serious parody of Kierkegaard's idea of truth as subjectivity by making truth objectivity in 1947. 

Herbert Read summed up Kierkegaard's book this way in his 1947 book, The Coat of Many Colors: The Unscientific Postscript is but one more voluminous commentary on the main theme of all Kierkegaard’s work, the dilemma which he represented by the phrase “either-or”: either aesthetic immediacy, which includes not only the eudaemonistic search for pleasure, but also despair (the “sickness unto death”) and religious or metaphysical self-explanation; or the ethical along with the religion of immanence and immediacy and (as its culmination) Christianity apprehended as a paradox. In the Postscript Kierkegaard is chiefly concerned to define the nature of the religious alternative: to make it clear to his readers that it is not a choice between the aesthetic life and any sort of religion, but between true religion and every other possible alternative. And true religion is distinguished by its immediacy, without which it cannot live. Immediacy is opposed to reflection: it is direct apprehension, either by the senses or by intuition, and it is the only means by which we can apprehend “being“.  Subjectivity is the truth”, and it is upon this basis that Christianity must be interpreted and believed.  The Coat of Many Colors by Herbert Read  p. 253

The question as to whether Kierkegaard was an existentialist was brought up by Libuse Lukas Miller. She wrote the following in 1957: 

In 1962 Jean T Wilde edited The Search For Being and included an excerpt from Kierkegaard's Concluding Postscript concerning Gotthold Lessing. Wilde says, "In the Concluding Postscript the question of "the objective problem concerning the truth of Christianity" is dealt with in the first part. Kierkegaard shows that neither historically nor speculatively can we have objective knowledge of Christianity's truth or of its untruth. He says "a logical system is possible, but an existential system is impossible."

In 1963 Kenneth Hamilton described Paul Tillich as an individual who was as anti-Hegel as Kierkegaard was. He was referring to Kierkegaard's distrust of system builders which he discussed in The Concluding Unscientific Postscript (p. 13-15, 106-112.) 

Anoop Gupta (b. 1969) discussed Kierkegaard's idea of truth in Kierkegaard's Romantic Legacy: Two theories of the Self. 2005 (p. 19)  Gupta said "what we need to understand is what Kierkegaard means by "truth". He does not think that mere facts (truth) set one free. For example, it is "true" that given certain purities of water and atmospheric pressures, water will boil at one hundred degrees Celsius. Of course, Kierkegaard does not think the realization of this truth will make one free. Rather, truth is something to be attained, actualized, lived. In short, truth is not some objective fact that we can look at disinterestedly, as a spectator in a laboratory. If we mobilize our freedom toward this end, toward self-becoming, we will be using our freedom to bring forth truth." (University of Ottawa Press)

Joseph H. Smith (1927-) says that Kierkegaard shifts attention from (objective) truth to a question of function because there are other truths than propositions such as "truth of persons and how that truth corresponds to the content of professed beliefs." He thinks Kierkegaard is talking about the serious person always "having the honest suspicion of thyself."

References

External links
 
 D. Anthony on Concluding Unscientific Postscript
 
 Robert L. Perkins International Commentary on Concluding Unscientific Postscript to Philosophical Fragments Google books
 Arthur F. Holmes Historical Roots of Existentialism: Kierkegaard Wheaton College
 Soren Kierkegaard by Absurd Being (YouTube) Metaphysics, Subjective-Objective Truth

1846 books
Books by Søren Kierkegaard
Epistemology literature
Metaphysics books
Philosophy of religion literature
Works published under a pseudonym